Ljilja Drljević (born 30 November 1984) is a Serbian chess player who holds the title of Woman International Master (WIM, 2007). She won the Serbian Women's Chess Championship in 2016.

Chess career
Drljević won the 2007 Mediterranean Women's Chess Championship in Sousse. In early 2009, she switched from the Montenegro Chess Federation to the Serbian Chess Federation. She was second in 2010 World Student Chess Championship in Zürich. After getting a bronze medal in the 2010 national women's championship in Pančevo, she finally won the Serbian Women's Chess Championship in 2016.

Ljilja Drljević played for Montenegro and Serbia in the Women's Chess Olympiads:
 In 2008, at second board in the 38th Chess Olympiad (women) in Dresden (+4, =1, -4),
 In 2016, at reserve board in the 42nd Chess Olympiad (women) in Baku (+5, =2, -2).

Ljilja Drljević played for Montenegro and Serbia in the European Team Chess Championships:
 In 2007, at first board in the 7th European Team Chess Championship (women) in Heraklion (+2, =1, -5),
 In 2011, at fourth board in the 9th European Team Chess Championship (women) in Porto Carras (+1, =3, -2).

Ljilja Drljević played for FR Yugoslavia in the European Girls' U18 Team Chess Championships:
 In 2000, at first board in the 1st European U18 Team Chess Championship (girls) in Balatonlelle (+2, =2, -3),
 In 2002, at second board in the 3rd European U18 Team Chess Championship (girls) in Balatonlelle (+4, =2, -1).

In 2007, she was awarded the FIDE Woman International Master (WIM) title and received the FIDE Instructor title in 2015.

References

External links

1984 births
Living people
Montenegrin chess players
Serbian female chess players
Yugoslav female chess players
Chess Woman International Masters
Chess Olympiad competitors